Geoffrey Crawford may refer to:
 Geoffrey W. Crawford (born 1954), American judge in Vermont
 Geoffrey Crawford (rower) (1904–1942), English rower
 Geoff Crawford (1916–1998), Australian politician
 Ravage (Marvel Comics), the alter ego of a fictional professor named Geoffrey Crawford